Kairi Look (born April 19, 1983) is an Estonian children’s writer and author of short prose.

Biography
Kairi Look graduated in 2005 University of Tartu with a bachelor's degree in physiotherapy, and in 2008 with a master's degree as a children's rehabilitation specialist from the University of Amsterdam, Netherlands. She has studied in the same field in Finland and the University of Ghent, in Belgium, and completed a study on theatre-specific creative writing in Tallinn. She has worked at the Cité internationale des arts in Paris and as a publisher of academic literature in Amsterdam. In addition to children´s literature, she writes prose and book critique, and translates fiction from Dutch to Estonian. She has received the annual prize of the literary magazine Looming for the best novella (Relapse, Looming nr 12/2017). She has been a member of the Estonian Writers’ Union from 2015.

Bibliography 

Children´s books
 Leemuripoeg Ville teeb sääred (Ville the Lemur Flies the Coop), Tänapäev 2012
 Peeter, sõpradele Peetrike (Peter – “Pete” to his Friends), Tänapäev 2014; Koolibri 2022
 Lennujaama lutikad ei anna alla (The Airport Bugs Fight On), Tänapäev 2014, 2017
 Piia Präänik kolib sisse (Piia Biscuit Moves In), Tänapäev, 2015; Koolibri 2022
 Sasipäiste printsesside saar (The Isle of Messy-Haired Princesses), Päike ja Pilv 2016
 Härra Klaasi pöörane muuseum (The Kooky Museum of Mr. Glass), Tallinna Keskraamatukogu 2016
 Piia Präänik ja bandiidid (Piia Biscuit and the Bandits), Tänapäev, 2019
 Piia Präänik ja sõnasööbik (Piia Biscuit and the Word-Snatcher), Koolibri, 2021

Prose for adults
 Relaps, Looming  12/2017 (short story)
 Ümbermäng, Looming 2/2019 (short story)

Anthologies
 Eesti Novell 2020, Eesti Jutt MTÜ
 Neue Nordische Novellen VII, Heiner Labonde Verlag 2021
 The Baltic Literary Review: No More Amber 1/2021

Translations 
The Airport Bugs Fight On
 French: Les punaises de l’aéroport font de la résistance, Le Verger des Hespérides 2019
 Finnish: Lentokentän lutikat, Aviador 2018
 Latvian: Lidostas blaktis nepadodas, Pētergailis 2019
 Russian: Клопиная книга. Обитатели аэропорта не сдаются, КПД 2019

Ville the Lemur Flies the Coop
 Lithuanian: Lemūriukas Vilius iškeliauja, BaltArt 2019
 German: Ville macht sich auf die Socken, BaltArt 2013

Piia Biscuit Moves In
 Finnish: Piia Pikkuleipä muuttaa, Aviador 2019

Piia Biscuit and the Bandits
 Latvian: Pija Prjaņika un bandīti, Pētergailis 2020

Piia Biscuit and the Word-Snatcher
 Latvian: Pija Prjaņika un Vārdēdis, Petergailis 2022

As a translator 
 "Milla ja mere lapsed", Eesti Raamat, 2022 (from Dutch, "Lampje" by Annet Schaap, Querido, 2017)
 "Kriimik", Eesti Raamat, 2022 (from Dutch, "Floddertje" by Annie M.G. Schmidt, Querido, 1973)

Awards 
 2012 Children's Story Competition "My First Book", 3rd place (Ville the Lemur Flies the Coop)
 2014 Children's Story Competition "My First Book", 1st place (The Airport Bugs Fight On)
 2014 Good Children’s Book (The Airport Bugs Fight On)
 2015 Good Children’s Book (Piia Biscuit Moves In)
 2015 Tartu Prize for Children’s Literature (Childhood Prize) (Peter – “Pete” to his Friends)
 2018 Looming magazine annual prize for the best short story (Relapse, Looming nr 12/2017)

References 

1983 births
Living people
Estonian children's writers
Estonian women children's writers
University of Tartu alumni
University of Amsterdam alumni
21st-century Estonian women writers
Writers from Tallinn